This article deals with transport in Waterford city in Ireland.  The city is connected by road, rail, bus, air and sea.  
There are currently proposals for a bus rapid transit (BRT) system, consisting of bus trams, or streetcars, to be used in future.

Rail

Rail services in Waterford are provided by Iarnród Éireann, Ireland's national railway system. Rail services run from Plunkett Station Waterford. The station is located across Rice Bridge on the North side of the city. Services are provided to Dublin, Limerick, Rosslare Europort, Kilkenny, Clonmel. Freight services are also provided to Dublin, Port of Waterford and Rosslare Europort

There are seven daily services to Dublin, including an express service which departs at 07:10 and takes 1 hour 50 minutes. Other services take around 2 Hours 10 Minutes. On Sundays there are four services.

There are two daily services to Limerick Junction via Clonmel. All services connect with Limerick, Cork (city), Ennis and Galway.

There used to be one daily service to Rosslare Europort. The service connected with Stena Line and Irish Ferries sailings to Fishguard and Pembroke Dock in the UK respectively. This rail service was announced to be suspended starting from 21 July 2010. It was replaced by a revised Bus Éireann Route 370 service from 20 September 2010. However this bus service does not serve Waterford   Railway Station.  In November 2016 it was revealed that Waterford could lose its connection to Limerick Junction by 2018 with the closure of the Limerick Junction Waterford line by CIE/IE to save money as the line has low demand.

The  narrow gauge Waterford and Suir Valley Railway follows 10 km of the old Waterford to Dungarvan - Cork route along what is now part of the Deise Greenway. It is a heritage line that runs between Bilberry outside Waterford and Kilmeaden. The railway is a registered charity which operated by volunteers.

Coach
Eurolines Coach route 890 ceased running in 2018.

Bus

Bus Éireann and JJ Kavanagh and Sons provide bus services around Waterford city centre and to other towns and cities in Ireland.  All regional bus services depart from the Waterford Bus Station on the quay and city centre services run throughout the city.

Planning for Bus lanes in the city centre are at an early stage and bus lanes will be on Parnell Street, Manor Street, The Mall, and the South Quays.  A bus lane will be in each direction. On street parking will be removed from Parnell Street to facilitate the lanes. All of this is part of the city centre green plan.

Bus Éireann City services

J. J. Kavanagh & Sons Waterford City Service

Bus Éireann Regional services

J. J. Kavanagh & Sons

Dublin Coach

Suir Way Regional services

Roads

On 19 October 2009 the N25 Waterford City Bypass opened. The road was designed as a toll road.

On 22 March 2010, a section of the M9 opened as part of the new motorway linking Waterford with Dublin. The final section between Carlow and Knocktopher was opened on 9 September 2010, completing the  route. Journey times to Kilkenny, Carlow and Dublin have been reduced.

In 2007 the R710 Outer Ring Road opened. The road is a dual-carriageway which connects Ardkeen with the Waterford City Bypass, which in turn connects to major primary routes. The R709 forms the Inner Ring Road around the south of the inner city. Waterford Airport is located on the R708 road, accessible from the city centre and ring roads.

Cycling
Waterford City Council are in the early stages of planning to have Cycle tracks in the city centre as part of the city centre green plan.  There are other cycle tracks in the city but they are not in the main city centre.  The new cycle lanes will be on Parnell Street, Manor Street, The Mall, and the South Quays.  There will be a lane in each direction.

In July 2010 Waterford City Council have started to put cycle lanes around the city.  Currently there is a cycle lane in both directions on the Cork road.  They start from Ballybeg and continue into the city centre.  There are also lanes being put on the quays.

The Waterford Greenway is Ireland's longest greenway, and connects the city with Mount Congreve, Kilmeaden, Kilmacthomas, and Dungarvan.

Waterford Port
Port of Waterford which was located adjacent to the city centre until 1992 was moved to Belview on the N29 on the north bank of the River Suir. The Port is the closest to mainland Europe from Ireland. Waterford Port is one of the busiest ports in Ireland.

The port is important for tourism in Waterford. Cruise Ships dock in Dunmore East, Waterford Port and the quay in Waterford City Centre.  In September 2008 a new 190-metre quay was built that cost €11 million.

In 2017 the port of Waterford handled a gross tonnage of 2.5 million.

The port hosted the Tall Ships race in 2005 and 2011.

The closest passenger port is Rosslare Europort in County Wexford (72 km (45 miles) away by road), which has services to Fishguard, Pembroke Dock, Cherbourg, Roscoff and Le Havre.

Air

Waterford Airport is located 9 km south-east of Waterford.  The airport serves Waterford and the south east region. There is currently no carrier operating flights at this airport. Aer Southeast is a new carrier established at Waterford Airport in 2017 and will operate flights to London Luton, Birmingham, and Manchester when they obtain a licence to operate these services.

There is an air sea rescue service operating out of Waterford Airport from a dedicated Irish Coastguard base. This operation is currently contracted to a private operator, CHC Ireland. Rescue cover is provided by a Sikorsky S-61. A reserve S-61 helicopter is also based here.

See also
Transport 21
Transport in Ireland
Rail transport in Ireland
Roads in Ireland

References

External links
Bus Eireann
Irish Rail
JJ Kavanagh
Port of Waterford
Suir Way
Waterford Airport
South Tipperary Rail & Bus Website(Waterford-Clonmel-Limerick Junction)